Johann Conrad Dorner (15 August 1809 - 30 June 1866) was an Austrian painter.

Biography
Born at Egg, near Bregenz, in 1810, and studied historical painting under Cornelius. In 1836 he went to St. Petersburg, and there painted many portraits and altarpieces. He afterwards returned to Munich, and in 1860 went to Rome, where he died in 1866.

He executed his best works whilst in the Italian city, mostly of religious character. A Madonna and Child, with St. John and an Infant Christ are in the Pinakothek at Munich.

References
 

19th-century Austrian painters
19th-century Austrian male artists
Austrian male painters
1809 births
1866 deaths
People from Bregenz District